Bakhari is a rural locality (a settlement) in Krasnovishersky District, Perm Krai, Russia. The population was 46 as of 2010. There are 2 streets.

Geography 
Bakhari is located 7 km north of Krasnovishersk (the district's administrative centre) by road. Naberezhny is the nearest rural locality.

References 

Rural localities in Krasnovishersky District